Leesburg is a small unincorporated community in Harrison County, Kentucky, United States.  It is near the cities of Paris, Cynthiana, and Georgetown.

History
In the 19th century Leesburg contained a hotel and six stores. A post office was established at Leesburg in 1817, and remained in operation until it was discontinued in 1917.

References

Unincorporated communities in Harrison County, Kentucky
Unincorporated communities in Kentucky